R603 road may refer to:
 R603 road (Ireland)
 R603 (South Africa)